R1a-SUR51 - Y-chromosomal paternal line, found in modern Bashkirs, Mishars, Hungarians and Serbs.

Currently, two kings from the Arpad dynasty, as a result of paleogenetic studies, have been established as representatives of the R1a-SUR51 lineage - these are Bela III, and Ladislaus I of Hungary.

Clan-tribal affiliation and distribution area of representatives of the line R1a-SUR51 
Representatives of the R1a-SUR51 line are currently settled in  Bashkiria, Tatarstan,  Nizhny Novgorod and  Ryazan regions, in Hungary  and in Serbia.

Bashkirs46 RU-BA samples from Bashkortostan, Russia 
 Uchalinsky District Bashkortostan
Sura-Teleu, Zium-Teleu, Bure-Teleu, Oghuz-Teleu;
  Kuyurgazinsky,  Burzyansky and Kugarchinsky District s of Bashkortostan
Huun-Qipsak, Qariy-Qipsak, Boshman-Qipsak, Sankem-Qipsak;
 Burzyansky and Kuyurgazinsky districts of Bashkortostan
Nughay-;
 Abzelilovsky District Bashkortostan
Babsak-Qaraghay-Qipsak;
 Abzelilovsky and Meleuzovsky District s of Bashkortostan
Shakman-Tamyan;
  Zianchurinsky and Khaibullinsky District s of Bashkortostan, Orenburg Region
Aqsak-Usergan;
 Aktanyshsky District Tatarstan
Sarish-Qipsak;

Mishars 
 Drozhzhanovsky District Tatarstan
Barkhievs, Tuktamyshevs and others;
 Nizhny Novgorod Region (Krashiy Ostrov).
Bilyaletdinovs and others;
 Temnikov, Ryazan region
Derbyshevs and others;

Hungarians 
 Fejér County.

Serbs 
 South Bačka District (Voevodina).

Ethnogenomic tree
R1a-Z645>Z93>Z94>Z2124>Z2125>Z2123>Y2632>Y2633>SUR51

The ancestral subclades R1a-Y2632 are found among the Saka population of the Tien Shan, date: 427-422 BC.

Lifetime of a common ancestor between the Arpad dynasty and the Bashkirs R1a-SUR51 
According to the research of Peter L. Nagy, Judit Olasz and others, the lifetime of a common ancestor between the Bashkir R1a-SUR51 and the Arpad dynasty falls on the beginning of our era. Another researcher Bulat A. Muratov displays the time of the divergence of the Bashkirs R1a-SUR51 from the Arpad dynasty to the 7th century AD.

Bibliography and Notes
Arpad Dynasty

References

Haplogroup R
Indo-European genetics
Human Y-DNA haplogroups
 
Nomadic groups in Eurasia
History of Central Asia
 
Hungarian nobility
Hungarian tribes and clans